Yedioth Ahronoth (lit. Latest News) is a national daily newspaper published in Tel Aviv, Israel. Founded in 1939 in British Mandatory Palestine, Yedioth Ahronoth is the largest paid newspaper in Israel by sales and circulation.

The newspaper is published in tabloid format, and according to one author, its marketing strategy emphasizes "drama and human interest over sophisticated analysis." It has been described as "undoubtedly the country's number-one paper." The paper is open to a wide range of political views.

History

1939–1948: Foundation and expansion 
Yedioth Ahronoth was established in 1939 by an investor named Gershom Komarov. It was the first evening paper in Mandatory Palestine, and attempted to emulate the format of the London Evening Standard. Running into financial difficulties, Komarov sold the paper to Yehuda Mozes, a wealthy land dealer who regarded the paper as an interesting hobby and a long-term financial investment. His sons, Reuben and Noah, ran the paper with Noah as the first managing editor.

1948–1984: In competition with Maariv 
In 1948, a large group of journalists and staff members led by chief editor Ezriel Carlebach left to form Yedioth Maariv, shortly later known as Maariv. According to Dr. Carlebach and his associates, their reason for leaving Yedioth Ahronoth was Mozes' interference in their editorial decisions. He was replaced as chief editor by Herzl Rosenblum. Carelbach is considered the most prominent journalist of his era and his and his associates' departure from Yedioth is commonly known in Israeli media history as "The Putsch". This began an ongoing battle for circulation and prestige between the rival newspapers, which peaked during the 1990s when both papers were discovered to have bugged one another's phones. In the first decades following Carlebach's departure Maariv's circulation greatly outnumbered Yedioth's although over the years Yedioth's readership grew steadily and by the early 1980s its circulation eclipsed Maariv's and therefore became the country's largest newspaper. This success was in large part thanks to the efforts of Dov Yudkovski, a distant cousin of Mozes and holocaust survivor who joined Yedioth following "the Putsch" in 1948, serving as editorial manager between 1953 and 1986, and chief editor between 1986 and 1989. Although officially Rosenblum held the title of chief editor between 1948 and 1986, his duties only extended to writing the paper's leading editorial article while Yudkovski acted as chief editor in practice.

1984–1993: In competition with Hadashot 
On March 4, 1984, a new competitor to Yediot Ahronoth was established, the Hadashot newspaper founded by Amos Shocken. Hadashot featured a large color headline and color pages, and used more innovative and less formal language. Its main target audience were the readers of Yediot Ahronot, a situation that required Yediot Ahronot to react in order to maintain its readers and market position. Yediot-editor Moshe Vardi, together with Noni Mozes, led the transition of the newspaper to printing in color. Zeev Galili was appointed head of reporters, recruited a series of freelance reporters from other newspapers, and worked to improve the newspaper's ability to obtain scoops. The changes in Yediot Ahronot paid off, and Hadashot was forced to close after nine years of activity, after heavy losses for Shocken Family.

1993–2007: Back in control 
For his achievements, Yudkovski was awarded the Sokolov Prize for Journalism in 2000 and the 2002 Israel Prize in Communications.

Moshi Vardi  was replaced as editor in 2005 by Rafi Ginat. Shilo De-Beer was promoted to editor in April 2007.

Since 2007: In competition with Israel Hayom
In 2007, a new competitor to Yediot, Israel Hayom, was launched. Israel Hayom is a free newspaper, owned by the family of casino mogul Sheldon Adelson. In July 2010, a TGI survey reported that Israel HaYom had overtaken Yedioth Ahronoth as the most read newspaper in terms of exposure with a rate of 35.2% compared to Yedioth's 34.9%.

De-Beer was replaced as editor by Ron Yaron in 2011. As of 2017, the paper is headed by Noah Mozes's son, Arnon Mozes. In January 2017, secret recordings were released of conversations between Prime Minister Benjamin Netanyahu and Mozes discussing a potential deal in which the newspaper would provide better coverage of Netanyahu in exchange for the government limiting the circulation of competitor Israel Hayom.

As of 2020, Yedioth Ahronoth was the second most read newspaper in Israel, with a 21.5% readership exposure, losing only to the freely-distributed Israel HaYom, which had a 23.7% exposure. Haaretz was the third most read newspaper in Israel, with a 4.9% readership, followed by Maariv with 4.5%.

In 2022, a TGI survey indicated that Yedioth Ahronoth has a 23.9% weekday readership exposure, second only to Israel HaYom, with 31%, and followed by Haaretz with 4.7% and Maariv with 3.5%.

Political leaning
Yedioth Ahronoth was described as generally critical of Benjamin Netanyahu. A study conducted by Moran Rada with the Israeli Democracy Institute showed that Yedioths coverage of the 2009 Israeli legislative election was biased in favor of Kadima and its leader Tzipi Livni in most editorial decisions and that the paper chooses to play down events that do not help to promote a positive image for her, while on the other hand, touting and inflating events that help promote Livni and her party. Oren Frisco reached a similar conclusion after the 2009 Knesset elections, writing that throughout the campaign, Yediot Ahronoth was biased against Netanyahu.

In 2017 it was revealed that Netanyahu had three meetings with Yedioth Ahronoth's chairman and editor Arnon Mozes, during which Netanyahu claimed he could limit Israel HaYom's distribution if Mozes would change Yedioth's coverage as to make it more favorable to Netanyahu's government. This led to the opening of "Case 2000", one of the ongoing corruption investigations against Netanyahu.

Yedioth Ahronot Group
The newspaper is owned by the Yedioth Ahronoth Group, which also owns shares in several Israeli mass media companies, such as "Channel 2", a commercial television channel; "Hot", the national cable TV company; "Yedioth Tikshoret", a group of weekly local newspapers; Vesti, a Russian language newspaper; magazines, such as the weekly TV guide magazine Pnai Plus and weekly women's magazine La'Isha; and other non-media companies.

Yedioth Ahronoth has its own publishing house called "Yedioth Sfarim" (Hebrew ידיעות ספרים).

See also

 List of newspapers in Israel
 Media of Israel
 Ynet, internet version of the newspaper in Hebrew
 Ynetnews, internet version in English
 YnetEspanol, internet version in Spanish

References

External links

  
 Yedioth Ahronoth subscriptions portal 
 Ynetnews news website linked to the paper 
Company profile on Bloomberg (in English)

 
1939 establishments in Mandatory Palestine
Companies based in Tel Aviv
Hebrew-language newspapers
Israeli brands
Jewish businesses established in Mandatory Palestine
Mass media in Tel Aviv
Daily newspapers published in Israel
Newspapers established in 1939